Borgersen is a surname. Notable people with the surname include:

Bård Borgersen (born 1972), Norwegian football defender
Christopher Borgersen Hoen (1767–1845), Norwegian farmer and politician
Kristine Lunde-Borgersen (born 1980), Norwegian handballer
Morten Borgersen (born 1950), Norwegian actor, theatre instructor and theatre director
Odd Borgersen (born 1980), Norwegian long track speed skater
Reidar Borgersen (born 1980), Norwegian former racing cyclist

See also
Bergeforsen
Bergesen (disambiguation)
Birgersson
Bürgersinn

Norwegian-language surnames